The Civil Engineer Corps (CEC) is a staff corps of the United States Navy. CEC officers are professional engineers and architects, acquisitions specialists, and Seabee Combat Warfare Officers who qualify within Seabee units.  They are responsible for executing and managing the planning, design, acquisition, construction, operation, and maintenance of the Navy's shore facilities.  The Civil Engineer Corps is under the command of the Chief of Civil Engineers and Commander, Naval Facilities Engineering Systems Command.  On 12 August 2022, RADM Dean VanderLey relieved RADM John W. Korka, becoming the 46th commander of NAVFAC and Chief of Civil Engineers.

Present day CEC ranks range from CWO2 to RADM, though the community is phasing out Chief Warrant Officer ranks in favor of Limited Duty Officers.  Several Civil Engineer Corps officers, primarily those serving during or around the time of World War II, have held the rank of Vice Admiral, and one officer, Ben Moreell, has held the four-star rank of Admiral, but there are no current billets within the US Navy that require Civil Engineer Corps officers of either rank.  The worldwide CEC Active- and Reserve-Component authorized end strength is shown below.

History 

Civil engineers were employed by the Navy Department as early as 1827, when Mr. Loammi Baldwin was appointed to superintendent of the construction of dry docks at Boston and Norfolk. Prior to the passage of the Act of 2 March 1867 civil engineers were appointed by the Secretary, but under authority of that act they were to be commissioned by the President by and with the advice and consent of the Senate; they were appropriated for as part of the civil establishment at the several navy yards and stations under the control of the Bureau of Yards and Docks until 1870. At that time their pay was regulated by section 3 of the Act of 15 July 1870 that  "fixed" the annual pay of officers of the Navy on the active list. Appropriations for their pay have been made since 1870 under the head of "Pay of the Navy".

The discretionary authority given to the President by the Statute of 3 March 1871, to determine and fix the relative rank of civil engineers was not exercised until the 24th of February 1881, when relative rank was conferred upon them and fixed as follows: One with the relative rank of captain (CAPT), two with that of commander (CDR), three with that of lieutenant-commander (LCDR), and four with that of lieutenant (LT).

The Navy Regulations for 1876 failed to list civil engineers among the staff officers of the Navy, and the uniform regulations for that year did not prescribe a uniform or a corps device for that class of officer. In 1881, after having had relative rank conferred upon them, civil engineers were instructed by Uniform Circular dated 24 August to wear the uniform of officers of the line with whom they had relative rank - omitting the star, but with the distinctive letters C.E. (Old English) embroidered in silver in the center.  The same letters to be similarly embroidered on frogs of epaulets.

In 1905, two crossed silver sprigs, each composed of two oak leaves and an acorn (sometimes called "Crossed Bananas"), was adopted as the insignia of the Civil Engineer Corps replacing the Old English letters C.E.  These were to be worn on the epaulets, shoulder straps and collar of the service coat.  While the pattern of this corps device remained the same, uniform regulations issued in 1919 specified that it was to be embroidered in gold instead of silver and worn on the sleeve of frock, evening dress, and blue service coats, above the gold lace strips, and on shoulder marks for white service coat and overcoat. By these same regulations the light blue cloth worn under the sleeve strips, and worn on the shoulder marks since 1899, was abolished as a distinction of the corps, however is still present in the light blue color of the stripes worn by enlisted, pay grades E-3 and below in the Navy's construction field.

In 1939 the CEC was composed of 126 active officers.  By VJ day that number had grown to only 200.  However, there were over 10,000 reservists providing the leadership of the Construction Battalions.
In December 1941 Admiral Ben Moreell proposed the creation of three Naval Construction Battalions.  A problem then confronted BuDocks, who would command the Construction Battalions? Naval regulations stated that military command of naval personnel was strictly limited to line officers, yet BuDocks deemed it essential that these Construction Battalions be commanded by officers of the Civil Engineer Corp, who were trained in the skills required for construction work. The newly formed Bureau of Naval Personnel (BuPers), successor to the Navy's Bureau of Navigation, strongly opposed this transgression of Naval tradition.  Admiral Moreell took the question personally to the Secretary of the Navy, Frank Knox, who, on 19 March 1942, gave authority for officers of the Civil Engineer Corps to exercise military authority over all officers and enlisted men assigned to construction units otherwise known as the Seabees.  For those engineers assigned to the Seabees a silver Seabee was mounted to the center of the CEC crossed oak leaves insignia.  The Seabee logo incorporated the CEC insignia, with one on each arm of the Seabee, just above each glove.

Besides providing the command leadership and engineering skills needed by the Naval Construction Force (NCF), the CEC made a major contribution to the war effort. CAPT. John N. Laycock created the Seabee's "magic box".  Today's Navy lighterage pontoon is a direct descendant of his creation.

Early in 1943 the Navy began training its first African American officers.  In May, MIT graduate Edward Swain Hope, was the first to enter the CEC.  He went through training at Camp Endicott and was posted as the Public Works officer at Manana Barracks, Hawaii Territory as a Lieutenant. Manana Barracks was the largest "black installation" the U.S. military had.  He eventually was promoted to  Lieutenant Commander which made him the  Navy's highest ranking African American during WWII.

The first CEC killed in Pacific combat were Lt. Irwin W. Lee and Lt. (jg) George W. Stephenson along with 23 enlisted of the 24th CB.  They died in an air raid on 2 July 1943 on Rendova Island.  The Seabees named their Naval Training Center at Quoddy Village Eastport, Maine,  Camp Lee-Stephenson in honor of them.

The first CEC killed in the Atlantic combat was Lt. Carl M. Olson of St Paul, Minnesota, on 10 September 1943 at Salerno, Italy.  His design for the landing end of pontoon assemblies was used throughout the war.

 Capt. Wilfred L. Painter (CEC) was awarded four Gold Stars to the Legion of Merit (plus the Combat "V" for each of the additional stars).  Lt. Painter received his first award for his leadership in the salvage of the  USS California and the USS West Virginia at Pearl Harbor.  For the West Virginia Lt. Painter got 120 seabees from the 16th CB to expedite the operation including pouring 650 tons of marine concrete to seal the hull.

USMC

During WWII the Seabees had a number of battalions transferred to the Marine Corps.  Those battalions were then given USMC designations and the men were given standard Marine Corps issue in addition to their dress naval uniform.  For CEC the standard gold and silver officer corps insignia was replaced by a brass subdued one on the garrison hat.  The battalions involved were the 18th, 19th, 25th, 53rd and 121st.(see 17th Marine Regiment, 18th Marine Regiment, 19th Marine Regiment, and 20th Marine Regiment) The 31st and 133rd CBs were issued USMC fatigues and attached to the shore parties of the 4th Marine Division and 5th Marine Division for Iwo Jima.  The CEC involved would have worn the subdued insignia also.  Other battalions were tasked with Marine Corps shore party assignments both prior to and post-Iwo Jima.

Tasked as combat engineers, the CEC of the 18th and 121st CBs designed a detachable ramp mounted on a LVT-2. Its purpose was to enable the Marines to land on Tinian's beaches bordered by coral embankments up to 15 feet high.  Ten LVTs were modified using iron beams salvaged from a sugar factory on Saipan.  The commanding General Harry Schmidt was skeptical of the design.  He ordered that a vehicle test one, a hundred times, before he would use it in combat. The ramps not only stood up, but they allowed the Marines to land where there were no defenses as a landing there had been thought impossible.   The astonished Japanese were overwhelmed and outflanked due to the ramps.  The LVTs were nicknamed "doodlebugs".

USMC Shore party Commanders
Guam: 3rd Marine Regiment, Cmdr. Wehlen CEC 3rd Battalion 19th Marines / Naval Construction Battalion 25 beaches Red 1 and Red 2
Bougainville: 3rd Marine Division  Cmdr. Brockenbrough CEC 71st CB with detachments from the 25th, 53rd, and the 75th CBs (and as well as the Marines). beaches: Blue 1,2,3 Yellow 1,2,3,4 Green 1,2 Red 1,2,3
Iwo Jima: 23rd Marine Regiment Cmdr. Raymond P. Murphy CEC, 133rd CB beaches Yellow 1 and Yellow 2.

Naval Combat Demolition Units
Operational Naval Demolition Unit No. 1. was the very first USN "demolitions" unit.  In early May 1943, a two-phase "Naval Demolition Project" was directed by the Chief of Naval Operations "to meet a present and urgent requirement". The first phase began at Amphibious Training Base (ATB) Solomons, Maryland with the establishment of Operational Naval Demolition Unit No. 1. Six Officers and eighteen enlisted men reported from NTC Camp Peary dynamiting and demolition school, for a four-week course. Those Seabees, led by Lt. Fred Wise CEC, were immediately sent to participate in the invasion of Sicily. When the unit returned to Camp Peary most of the men were assigned to the new Naval Combat Demolition Units being formed there.

Naval Combat Demolition Units were led by junior CEC officers.  There were over 200 NCDUs formed with all but five being requisitioned for the UDTs.

UDTs

V Amphibious Corps had identified coral as an issue for Amphibious landings in the Pacific and determined Naval Constructions Battalions had the only people with any experience with the material.  Lt. Thomas C. Crist CEC, from NCB 10 was in Honolulu from Canton Island where he had been involved in a lagoon coral head clearance project.  His being in Pearl Harbor turned out to be pivotal in UDT history.   Admiral Turner and V Amphibious Corps were interested in dealing with coral and had identified the Seabees as the only people with any applicable knowledge.  The Admirals staff learned of Lt. Crist's presence in Pearl Harbor and ordered him to report.  The Admiral commissioned Lt. Crist with developing a method to blast coral under combat conditions and staging qualified men in Pearl to form a unit for that task.  Lt. Crist had staged 30 officers and 150 enlisted from the 7th Naval Construction Regiment when the disaster at Tarawa happened.  With Kwajalein the next operation, Lt. Crist's 180 men were used to form UDT 1 and UDT 2.  Cmdr. E. D. Brewster (CEC) was selected to command UDT 1 and Lt Crist was picked for UDT 2.  That did not last as Admiral Connelly wanted a commander with combat experience.  So, Lt. Crist was made ops officer for team 2. At Kwajalein Ensign L. Leuhrs and Carp. W. Acheson CEC anticipated that they may not to get the intel Admiral Turner wanted just paddling a dinghy and wore swim trunks under their fatigues.  They decided to strip down and go in the water in broad daylight on a hostile beach to get what the Admiral wanted.  Doing that changed the UDT mission model and made them the predecessors of the Navy's special ops.  Upon returning to Hawaii Lt. Crist was named as the first Training Officer of the UDT program.  He was in the position only a short time when he was selected as commander of UDT 3.  For the Marianas operations of Kwajelein, Roi-Namur, Siapan, Tinian, Eniwetok, and Guam.  Admiral Turner recommended sixty silver stars and over three hundred bronze stars with Vs for the Seabees and others of UDTs 1-7, which was unprecedented in U.S. Naval and Marine Corps history.  For UDTs 5 and 7 every officer received a silver star and all the enlisted received bronze stars with Vs for Operation Forager (Tinian).  For UDTs 3 and 4 every officer received a silver star and all the enlisted received bronze stars with Vs for Operation Forager (Guam).  Admiral Richard Lansing Conolly felt the commanders of teams 3 and 4 (Lt. Crist and Lt. W.G. Carberry) should have received Navy Crosses.   When UDT 3 returned from Leyte in November 1944 it became the training instructors of the Maui school and Lt. Crist was made base Training Officer again.   The team would remain in these jobs until April 1945 when it was sent to Fort Pierce to do the same job there.  Lt. Crist had been promoted to Lt. Cmdr. and was sent back to Hawaii but his Team 3 Seabees would train teams 12–22.

Diving masks were not common in 1944 and a few men had tried using goggles at Kwajalein.   They were a rare item in the Hawaiian sports stores so Lt. Crist and Seabee Chief Howard Roeder and put in a request to the Supply Corps for them.  Fortuitously, a diving mask ad was spotted in a magazine.  That prompted a priority dispatch to the States appropriating the store's entire stock.

In 1944 the Navy created an unheralded program to dredge harbors to increase accessibility and stevedoring productivity at advance bases.  The 301st CB was created for the job and given two ex-NCDU (CEC) and two ex-UDT (CEC) to assist.  Between them they had three Silver stars and a Bronze star for valor.

Prisoners of War
During WWII fifteen CEC were taken as prisoners of war.  All were in the Pacific and all were taken at the onset of hostilities at Cavite, Philippines, Wake, and Guam.  Six would die: one executed, two from friendly fire, and three from mal-treatment.  One POW, Lt. Jerry Steward CEC, received the Navy Cross, Purple Heart with three gold stars, Army Distinguished Unit Badge with Oak leaf cluster, Philippine Distinguished Service Star and was the most decorated CEC officer of WWII. Postwar he retired as a Rear Admiral.

Camp David

The presidential retreat is officially Naval Support Facility Thurmont.  The CEC staffs the base command.  The Marine Corps provides base security while Seabees oversee base operations and maintenance.  The current base commander is Cmdr. Jeremy Ramburg(CEC) while the executive officer is Lcdr. Jannira Gregory (CEC).

The Naval Special Warfare Command building at the U.S.N. Seal base at Fort Pierce is named for LTJG Frank Kaine CEC commander of NCDU 2.

Chiefs of Civil Engineers

|}

Notable Seabees

	
 Ben Moreell
 David Robinson, NBA player who served two years active duty in the U.S. Navy with the CEC

See also
 Military engineering of the United States
 Seabees in World War II

 United States Navy Staff Corps
 Supply Corps 
 Medical Corps
 Chaplain Corps
 Civil Engineer Corps
 Nurse Corps
 Dental Corps
 Medical Service Corps

References

External links 
 CEC Accessions Website
 Seabee Website
 Civil Engineer Corps Officer School (CECOS) Website
 Navy Civil Engineer Corps History

Administrative corps of the United States Navy
Military units and formations established in 1867
Engineering units and formations of the United States military